The aquatic coral snake (Micrurus surinamensis) is a semiaquatic species of coral snake in the family Elapidae found in northern South America.

Common names 
Known as Cobra coral, Coral de agua, Coral acuatica venezolana (For Micrurus nattereri), Coralillo, Coral venenosa, Culebra del agua, Naca-naca, Naca-naca de agua, Boichumbeguaçu, Himeralli, Itinkia, Kraalslang, Koraalslang, Krarasneke, Kraka Sneki and Wata mio.

Description and behavior 
M. surinamensis is one of the heaviest and most robust coral snakes, they grow on average 80–100 cm, with a maximum of 135 cm, although there are unproven reports of 180 cm specimens. They are characterized by a long snout, large head, and eyes and nostrils located more dorsally than other coral snakes. The head is mainly red, with sharp black scales, the dorsal scales are thin and shiny, the supra-anal keels are present in males, but little developed. The body has red rings that are separated by 5 to 8 triads, each with a wide middle and two narrow black rings, separated by two narrow cream or yellowish rings.

This species is known to have mainly aquatic habits, swims very well and can remain submerged for a long period, it has mainly nocturnal habits, although it can also be active during the day, it is not aggressive towards humans, when it feels disturbed, it flattens the body and raises the tail. Its reproduction is oviparous, but the size of the brood has not yet been reported, it feeds mainly on swamp eels, bony fish, other snakes and amphibians.

Range and habitat 
It is an endemic species in South America, found in Bolivia, Brazil, Colombia, Ecuador, Guyana, French Guiana, Peru, Suriname and Venezuela. It occurs mainly in the drainages of the Orinoco River and the Amazon rainforest. It is found in humid forests with low mountains, and tropical forests along streams, rivers and bodies of water. It can also be common in humid lowland forest areas near sea level at 600 meters.

Venom 
Studies on Micrurus toxins are limited due to low venom production. Snakes of the genus Micrurus have a potent neurotoxic venom that causes neuromuscular blockage when competitively binding to acetylcholine receptors.  Bites are rare, but the venom of M. surinamensis causes paralysis of the cranial nerves, and can be fatal. A well-reported case occurred in the Amazon, where an 18-year-old biology student was bitten on the finger while trying to capture the snake. The victim arrived at the hospital in 20 minutes where he complained of blurred vision, difficulty speaking, swallowing, walking and opening his eyelids. The victim also had respiratory failure, as well as foam in the nose and mouth. The victim required mechanical ventilation due to severe breathing difficulties.

References 

surinamensis
Snakes of South America
Reptiles of Bolivia
Reptiles of Brazil
Reptiles of Colombia
Reptiles of Ecuador
Reptiles of French Guiana
Reptiles of Guyana
Reptiles of Peru
Reptiles of Suriname
Reptiles of Venezuela
Fauna of the Amazon
Reptiles described in 1817
Taxa named by Georges Cuvier
Semiaquatic animals